MTV Unplugged is the first live album by Canadian singer-songwriter Alanis Morissette, released by Maverick Records in the United States on November 9, 1999 (see 1999 in music). It comprises songs performed by Morissette on the television program MTV Unplugged.  Twelve tracks were included on the album, but Morissette performed several others, including "Baba", "Thank U" (both from 1998's Supposed Former Infatuation Junkie) and "Your House" (the hidden track on 1995's Jagged Little Pill), during her Unplugged concert. These were later released as B-sides on the "King of Pain" single release.  The first single, "That I Would Be Good", was moderately successful, and two other tracks, "King of Pain" (a cover of the song by The Police) and "You Learn" were released as singles outside North America.  As of March 2012, the album has sold 673,000 copies in the U.S.

In addition to material from Morissette's first two U.S. albums, MTV Unplugged featured performances of "No Pressure over Cappuccino" and "Princes Familiar", two previously unreleased songs from her tours, and "These R the Thoughts", a previously released b-side.  Morissette has stated that "Princes Familiar" in particular is one of her favorite and most vocally challenging songs.  She performed it on her 2005 Diamond Wink Tour, where she dedicated it to "all of the dads in the audience."  The ballad "No Pressure over Cappuccino", one of the first songs she wrote following the release of Jagged Little Pill, "was inspired by [her] twin brother," Wade.

Featuring cleaner vocals, slower arrangements and a few drastic reinventions (particularly in the case of "You Oughta Know"), MTV Unplugged foreshadowed much of Morissette's later, softer work, particularly 2005's Jagged Little Pill Acoustic and the accompanying Diamond Wink Tour.

Track listing

Personnel 
 Alanis Morissette - vocals, guitar, harmonica and flute
 Nick Lashley - guitar
 Joel Shearer - guitar
 Deron Johnson - keyboards, background vocals in "King of Pain"
 Chris Chaney - bass
 Gary Novak - drums and percussion
 Chris Fogel - mixing
 Brad Dutz - percussion
 David Campbell - musical arranger and viola
 Suzie Katayama - cello and string arrangement for "You Oughta Know"
 Joel Derouin - violin
 Laura Seaton - violin
 Erik Friedlander - cello
 Juliet Haffner - strings contractor

Charts

Weekly charts

Year-end charts

Certifications

References 

Alanis Morissette albums
Mtv Unplugged (Morissette, Alanis album)
1999 live albums
Albums arranged by David Campbell (composer)
Maverick Records live albums